Deditio or deditiones was a ritual of submission in medieval Europe. It was a ceremony of subjection between a monarch and their subject, and included the latter bowing or laying by the feet of the monarch, barefooted and wearing ropes. It was a planned ceremony, agreed upon, and was used as a means of  avoidance of escalation of conflicts, a strategy of peaceful solving of conflicts.

References

Byzantine culture
Rituals
Ceremonies
Reconciliation